The Bristol General Steam Navigation Company provided shipping services between Bristol and ports in southern Ireland, principally Cork from 1821 to 1980. There were also services to other destinations including ports in southern England, south Wales and France.

History

The company was founded in 1821 by eight Bristol merchants as the War Office Steam Packet Company which started services to Ireland to carry out a War Office contract to transport troops, recruits and convicts.

In 1827, when the War Office contract expired, it became the General Steam Packet Company to avoid confusion with London’s General Steam Navigation Company with whom they were in direct competition for services to the continent. By 1834 the name became Bristol Steam Packet Company and in 1835 the Bristol General Steam Navigation Company. In 1877 it changed to the Bristol Steam Navigation Company which continued until 1980.

Charles Shaw Lovell established his shipping agent’s business in 1869 and the business relationship with Bristol General Steam Navigation Company began in earnest in 1896. As part of the deal that saw Bristol Steam buy Gloucester Steamship Company, Lovell was issued with almost 25% of the ordinary capital of the company. Lovell brought to the table a commission from the Great Western Railway which Bristol Steam facilitated until 1947 when the line was nationalised. Egerton Lovell, Charles’ son, became a director for Bristol Steam… in 1901-2 whilst in his twenties.

Originally offering passenger and freight services between Bristol and a range of ports in Southern England, Wales and Ireland, passenger services were terminated in 1914 because of competition from the Great Western Railway at Fishguard.

Closure

Freight services continued until 1980.

Archives
Records of Bristol General Steam Navigation Company are held at Bristol Archives (Ref. 39458) (online catalogue 1) and (Ref. 40621) (online catalogue 2).

Accidents and incidents
On 21 January 1888 the 1871-built iron screw steamer Constance, which was from Rotterdam bound for Plymouth then Bristol, ran ashore outside Plymouth harbour in fog. The ship sank with the loss of three crew members.

The Calypso was an 1865-built screw steamer which was on a voyage from Antwerp to Gloucester in November 1890. Because of the bad weather it sheltered in the lee of the shore of Dungeness and was anchored with a number of other ships during the night. In the morning the Calypso was hit by the Spanish steamer Pinzon, damaged she was beached at Dungeness. The tug Zeelander then towed the Calpyso stern first in an attempt to take her to Dover. They soon got into trouble and the Sandgate lifeboat was called to remove the crew just before the vessel sank.

On 7 April 1899 the newly built Cato was on her second voyage from Cardiff to Hamburg encountered bad weather on the north coast of Cornwall. The ship sank and eight lives were lost and the Board of Trade held an inquiry, the inquiry cleared the master of any wrongful act.

In February 1916 the steamer Argo sank with the loss of one life.

In March 1923 the Echo was bound to Bristol from Hamburg when it hit the Portuguese ship Coimbra in the fog and sunk.

In May 1937 the steamer Alecto sank with the loss of ten lives. The Alecto which had left Swansea for Rotterdam hit the Yugoslav steamer Plavnik during the night in fog. The Plavnik rescued three men from the sea but a further ten were missing.

On 24 April 1963, the Cato was tied up alongside at Avonmouth when she was rammed by the Ellerman Line's City of Brooklyn.  The Cato sank at her moorings, but was later raised, and broken up in Newport.

References

1821 establishments in England
1980 disestablishments in England
Shipping companies of England
Packet (sea transport)
Defunct companies based in Bristol
Ferry companies of England
Defunct shipping companies of the United Kingdom
Transport companies disestablished in 1980
British companies established in 1821
Transport companies established in 1821
British companies disestablished in 1980